Government Arts College is an autonomous institution located in Coimbatore, Tamil Nadu. It is a liberal arts college affiliated to the Bharathiar University.

History
Government Arts College started as an Anglo-vernacular school in 1852. It became a first-grade college in 1870 and almost a century later, a post-graduate college in 1964, under the Madras University.

The college blazon was adopted as early as 1868 by then Principal C. C. Flanagan. After that it changed, in 1953 as a part of the centenary year celebration and in 1999 after the college was accredited, with four stars.

Academic Programmes
The college offers undergraduates and postgraduate programmes in arts and science affiliated to the Bharathiar University. It has been accredited by NAAC with an A Grade (CGPA 3.49)

UG Program :-

1.BA-Tamil literature, English literature, History, Tourism and travel management, Economics, Political science, Public Administration, Defence Studies, Business Administration

2.Bsc-Botany, Zoology, Chemistry, Physics, Mathematics, Psychology, Sociology, Geology, Geography, Statistics, Computer science, Information technology

3.Bcom-Commerce, Commerce with Computer Application, Commerce with International business.

Notable alumni
 Puviarasu, Tamil Poet
 Raghuvaran, actor
 Manivannan, Actor and Director
 Sathyaraj, Actor
 Ranjith, Actor
Jeeva, Lawyer, Artist 
 R. V. Udayakumar, Actor and Director
 R. N. Manickam, Officer, Indian Police Service 
 P. Nagarajan, Member of Parliament

References

External links
Official Website

Universities and colleges in Coimbatore
Colleges affiliated to Bharathiar University
Educational institutions established in 1868
1868 establishments in India
Academic institutions formerly affiliated with the University of Madras